The predominant religion in Honduras is Christianity, representing 87% of the total population according to a 2017 estimate. The country is secular and the freedom of religion is enshrined in the nation's constitution.

The pre-Hispanic peoples that lived in actual Honduras were primarily polytheistic Maya and other native groups. In the 16th century, Roman Catholicism was introduced by the Spanish Empire and still holds a 46% share of the population. Protestantism accounts for 41% of the country's population.

History

Ancient religion

The Maya religion was the ancient one. It was practiced a lot in the timeline of the 4th and 7th century, AD. It was practiced in some parts of Central and South America, and it was based on polytheistic beliefs and had to do with a big number of rituals with occasional animals and maybe even human sacrifices.

Post-colonial religion
The second Roman Catholic Mass celebrated in the continental New World was on August 13, 1502, in Punta Caxinas, two weeks after the so-called "discovery" of Honduras by Christopher Columbus. Thereafter, the Spanish began a process of converting and baptizing Honduran natives to the Catholic faith.

Honduras holds a small part of the former Mosquito Coast which came under British influence—now in the extreme southeast of the state. Protestant churches gained following in that sparsely populated area on the Caribbean coast, especially Anglicanism and the Moravian Church.

20th century

In recent years, the principal religious groups are Roman Catholic, Episcopal, Lutheran, Jehovah's Witness, Mennonite, approximately 300 evangelical Protestant groups, and the Church of Jesus Christ of Latter-day Saints (LDS Church).

The Catholic Church in Honduras is composed of eight dioceses: Tegucigalpa, Comayagua, Choluteca, Olancho, Yoro, San Pedro Sula, Trujillo and Copán which are a part of the Conference Episcopal of Honduras.

The Protestant churches are structured by three confederacies: The Pastors' Association of Honduras, the Evangelical Brotherhood of Honduras and the Apostolic Network of Honduras.

Both the Roman Catholic Church as well as the Protestant churches, especially the Pentecostal denominations, have experienced growth thanks in large part to modern forms of mass communication in recent decades.

The LDS Church built a temple in Tegucigalpa, Honduras, making it one of the six LDS temples in Central America.

The most prominent evangelical churches in the country include the "Abundant Life", the "Living Love", and the Great Commission Churches. A growing number of evangelical churches have no denominational affiliation. The National Association of Evangelical Pastors represents the evangelical leadership. There are small numbers of Muslims and Jews. San Pedro Sula has a mosque and a synagogue, and Tegucigalpa has a synagogue.

Statistics
There are no reliable government statistics on religious affiliation in Honduras. In a 2007 nationwide survey, CID-Gallup reported that:

47 percent of respondents identify themselves as Roman Catholic,
36 percent as evangelical Protestant, 
and 17 percent either provide no answer or consider themselves "other". According to CID-Gallup 2001, 70% was Catholic, 23% Protestant, 5% Others or D/A, and 2% was irreligious.

Religious freedom

The constitution of Honduras establishes the freedom of religion. The National Congress of Honduras has the power to legally recognize religious groups, which confers to them tax-exempt status and other privileges. The Catholic Church is the only organization legally recognized as a religious group, although other religious groups can register with the government as NGOs. Some religious groups have criticized this as constituting preferential treatment for the Catholic Church at the expense of other groups.

The constitution prohibits religious leaders from holding elected office or publicly making political statements. Despite this, some Protestant pastors have been elected to government positions and serve on government advisory bodies. The government also frequently includes Catholic or Protestant prayers as part of official events and ceremonies, which has been criticized by representatives of other religious groups.

Clergy are provided exemptions from being required to testify in court about information acquired from religious confessions. Vicars, bishops, and archbishops of the Catholic Church, as well as similarly high-ranking members of other religions, are not required to appear in court if subpoenaed.

Public schools are required to teach secular curricula. Private religious schools also operate in Honduras.

Foreign missionaries must register with the government. Some religious groups have reached agreements with the government to expedite this process.

Conscientious objection to military service is protected by law, including objection on religious grounds.

Some politicians, generally from opposition parties, have regularly used antisemitism rhetoric in their political statements.

See also
Islam in Honduras
Roman Catholicism in Honduras
Virgin of Suyapa, perhaps Honduras' most popular religious image.
Religion in Latin America

References